Otter Lake is a hamlet (and census designated place) located on NY 28 in the Town of Forestport in Oneida County, New York, United States. It is located by Otter Lake.

References

Hamlets in Oneida County, New York
Hamlets in New York (state)